Beñat Intxausti Elorriaga (born 20 March 1986) is a Spanish former professional road bicycle racer, who rode professionally between 2007 and 2019 for the Nicolas Mateos,  and  teams.

Career
Intxausti was born in Amorebieta-Etxano, Biscay. In 2012, he won the Vuelta a Asturias and finished 10th overall in the Vuelta a España despite working for his team leader, Alejandro Valverde. In 2013, Intxausti won stage 16 in the Giro d'Italia after being part of a breakaway and later finished 8th overall. He also had the leaders' jersey for one day. In the Tour of Beijing, Intxausti won the only mountain stage and claimed the general classification victory.

After five seasons with Movistar, in September 2015  announced that Intxausti would join them in 2016 on an initial two-year contract. However, after a promising start to 2016, Intxausti's career became blighted with illness and was unable to race for extended periods. In 2019, he moved to the lower-level  team. In January 2020, he announced his retirement from cycling.

Major results

2005
 1st Stage 3 Vuelta a Salamanca
2006
 1st Memorial Avelino Camacho
 2nd Overall Bidasoa Itzulia
1st Stage 3
 5th Clásica Memorial Txuma
2007
 5th Overall Tour de l'Avenir
 5th La Côte Picarde
2008
 8th Klasika Primavera
2009
 5th Subida a Urkiola
 7th Overall Vuelta a Burgos
 8th Overall Vuelta a Andalucía
2010
 2nd Overall Tour of the Basque Country
 3rd Overall Vuelta a Asturias
1st Stage 3b (ITT)
 5th GP Miguel Induráin
 7th Trofeo Deia
 10th Overall Critérium International
2011
 4th Overall Tour of the Basque Country
 5th Overall Tour de Romandie
 9th Circuito de Getxo
2012
 1st  Overall Vuelta a Asturias
1st  Points classification
 10th Overall Vuelta a España
1st Stage 1 (TTT)
2013
 1st  Overall Tour of Beijing
1st Stage 4
 4th Klasika Primavera
 8th Overall Giro d'Italia
1st Stage 16
Held  Pink Jersey after Stage 7
 8th Overall Tour of the Basque Country
2014
 3rd Overall Tour de Pologne
 6th Overall Tour de Romandie
 9th Circuito de Getxo
 10th Klasika Primavera
2015
 Giro d'Italia
1st Stage 8
Held  after Stages 8, 11–15
 2nd Overall Vuelta a Castilla y León
 3rd Overall Vuelta a Andalucía
 3rd GP Miguel Induráin
 4th Overall Critérium du Dauphiné
 6th Trofeo Andratx–Mirador d'es Colomer
2016
 3rd Overall Volta a la Comunitat Valenciana

Grand Tour general classification results timeline

References

External links

 
 
 
 
 
 

1986 births
Living people
Spanish male cyclists
Cyclists from the Basque Country (autonomous community)
People from Amorebieta-Etxano
Spanish Giro d'Italia stage winners
Sportspeople from Biscay